Gnaphosa cumensis is a ground spider species found in Ukraine, Russia and Mongolia.

See also 
 List of Gnaphosidae species

References

External links 

Gnaphosidae
Spiders of Europe
Spiders of Asia
Arthropods of Mongolia
Spiders of Russia
Spiders described in 1981